Roberto Alvarez may refer to:

Roberto Alvárez (born 1960), Mexican cross-country skier
Roberto Álvarez (tennis) (born 1971), Argentine tennis player
Roberto Álvarez Ríos (born 1932), Cuban artist
Roberto Álvarez (footballer) (born 1942), Spanish former footballer
The plaintiff in Roberto Alvarez v. Board of Trustees of the Lemon Grove School District (1931), the first successful school desegregation case

See also 
Bobby Álvarez (born 1955), Puerto Rican former basketball player
Mario Roberto Álvarez (1913–2011), Argentine architect